Ria Ritchie (born 23 September 1987) is an English singer-songwriter and recording artist. Signed to Takeover Entertainment in 2011, she released her debut single, entitled "Only One", in May 2012.

Life and career

Early life
Ria Ritchie was born and grew up in Lowestoft, a seaside resort and resort town on the North Sea coast of England and the most easterly point of the United Kingdom. Her father is South African and her mother is English. She is the younger sister of actor Reece Ritchie, actor in the American films 10,000 BC and Prince of Persia: The Sands of Time.

Career beginnings: 2012–present
Ria Ritchie released videos of her covering other artists songs with the guitar, receiving over 11 million views on YouTube. In December 2009, Ria began writing songs with Plan B, then in 2010 she created a studio partnership with songwriter Ruth-Anne Cunningham, who co-wrote Pixie Lott's debut album Turn It Up.

In 2010, Ria began talks with the discoverer of Rihanna and Ne-Yo, Jay Brown – business partner to rapper and entrepreneur Jay-Z. Ria was signed in 2011 by Takeover Entertainment who signed a contract with Jay-Z's entertainment company, Roc Nation.

In May 2012, Ria Ritchie released her first single, "Only One", and an extended play in 2012, with a debut album released in February 2013.

Artistry

Musical style
Ria Ritchie's style of music yearned from when she started singing from the age of 12. She taught herself the guitar from the age of 17. She grew up listening to a lot of Motown and soul music and her music is influenced by artists such as Alicia Keys, Beyoncé, Keisha White, John Legend, Aretha Franklin, Lauryn Hill, Plan B, Marvin Gaye, Stevie Wonder, and Al Green. She has done a few covers from some of these artists on her YouTube page.

Voice and timbre
Ria Ritchie is an alto Lyric Coloratura soprano with vocal range spanning a voice type more than four octaves (Scientific pitch notation: E3-D7).

Discography

Singles

As featured artist

Music videos

References

External links

1987 births
Living people
English pop singers
English women singer-songwriters
English women guitarists
English guitarists
English hip hop musicians
English people of South African descent
People from Lowestoft
21st-century English women singers
21st-century English singers
21st-century British guitarists
British hip hop singers
Takeover Entertainment artists
21st-century women guitarists